Amaryllis Tremblay is a Canadian actress from Quebec.

Career 
Tremblay appeared in a number of short films, and had a small role in the television series District 31, before being cast in her first significant film role as Nicolas' girlfriend in Genesis (Genèse). She has since appeared in the films Young Juliette (Jeune Juliette), Fabulous (Fabuleuses), Girls Shouldn't Walk Alone at Night (Les filles ne marchent pas seules la nuit) and Drunken Birds (Les oiseaux ivres), and the television series L'Écrivain public and Six degrés.

She won a Gémeaux Award for Best Actress in a Youth Series in 2021 for Six degrés, and the award for Breakout Performance in a Short Film at the 2021 Canadian Film Festival for Girls Shouldn't Walk Alone at Night. In 2022, she starred in Emmanuel Tardif’s In Broad Daylight (Au grand jour).

Personal life 
Tremblay grew up in a small town along the Canada–United States border. She spent most of her teen years in Victoriaville before moving to Montreal.

Filmography

Film

Television

References

External links

21st-century Canadian actresses
Canadian film actresses
Canadian television actresses
Actresses from Quebec
French Quebecers
Living people
Year of birth missing (living people)